Jim Thorpe – All-American (UK title: Man of Bronze) is a 1951 American biographical film directed by Michael Curtiz and starring Burt Lancaster as Jim Thorpe, the great Native American athlete who won medals at the 1912 Olympics and distinguished himself in various sports, both in college and on professional teams.

The film features some archival footage of both the 1912 and 1932 Summer Olympics, as well as other footage of the real Thorpe (seen in long shots).  Charles Bickford plays the famed coach Glenn Scobey "Pop" Warner, who was Thorpe's longtime mentor.  Bickford also narrates the film, which told of Thorpe's athletic rise and fall, ending on an upbeat note when he was asked by a group of boys to coach them.  Phyllis Thaxter portrays Thorpe's first wife.  The film's production company Warner Bros. used a number of contract players in the film, as well as a few Native American actors.

Plot
During a banquet, legendary football coach "Pop" Warner rises and gives a speech praising Jim Thorpe, which leads to a flashback.

Youngster Jim Thorpe runs all the way home before his first day at an Indian reservation school, but his father talks him into going back, telling him that he wants his son to make something of himself. Years later, a now-adult Jim arrives on the campus of Carlisle School to continue his education. He likes his roommates at the boarding school well enough, fast-talking Ed Guyac and the huge Little Boy Who Walk Like Bear, but nearly gets into a fight with upperclassman and football star Peter Allendine.

When the academic pressure becomes too much for him, Jim goes for a long run, during which he outraces some practicing track athletes. Witnessing this, coach Pop Warner talks Jim into joining the track team. Jim is so talented, versatile, and quick to learn that, at the next meet, Pop's team consists of just him (competing in all but the distance running events) and one other man. Jim by himself beats the other team. After a while, the newspapers are reporting his impressive feats.

Jim is attracted to another student, Margaret Miller, but has to compete for her affections with Peter. Seeing that football is more prestigious than track, he applies to join the football team. Pop, worried about losing most of his track team with a single injury, turns him down, then reluctantly gives in. However, he keeps Jim on the sideline. Finally, he lets Jim play in a game against Harvard, but only to kick the ball away. The first time, Jim is tackled for a loss before he can kick. The second time, he again has trouble catching the ball; about to be tackled, he starts running and scores a touchdown. Soon, he is a celebrated football star.

Jim tells Pop that he has finally figured out what he wants to do with his life: coach. Later, Pop tells him that scouts from a school looking for a coach will be in the crowd watching a showdown between Carlisle and an undefeated University of Pennsylvania juggernaut headed by another All-American, Tom Ashenbrunner. The teams end up in a 13–13 tie after Jim kicks a seemingly impossible field goal in the dying seconds. However, the job goes to the white Ashenbrunner. Jim suspects it is because he is an Indian.

By this time, he and Margaret are dating. Eventually, he tells he wants to marry her, in part because they belong together, as they are both Indians. When Margaret does not return for the new semester, Jim becomes despondent, particularly after he learns that Margaret is white. Pop arranges for Margaret to get a job as a nurse at the school, and steers Jim to her. They reconcile and get married.

Jim decides to become so famous someone will have to hire him as a coach. He enters the 1912 Olympics and wins both the pentathlon and the decathlon. However, when it is discovered that he was paid a pittance to play baseball one summer, he is disqualified and stripped of his medals and trophies because he is not an amateur.

Embittered, Jim turns to professional baseball and football to make a living. He and Margaret have a son, on whom he dotes. He envisions Jim Thorpe Jr. following in his footsteps and recapturing the glory stolen from him. However, the boy dies while Jim is away in Chicago with the Canton Bulldogs, sending him into a downward spiral. Eventually, Margaret leaves him.

Finally, Pop tracks him down, working as a lowly announcer at a dance marathon. Pop offers him a ticket to the opening of the 1932 Olympics, but Jim tears it up. Later, however, he tapes it back together and attends the ceremony. He reconciles with Pop and his resentment dissolves.

One day, he drives over a football that has gotten away from a group of kids. He buys a new one and presents it to the despondent bunch. Watching them play, he starts giving them pointers; they ask him to become their coach, lifting his spirits.

The film then returns to the banquet. Jim, who is in attendance, is inducted into Oklahoma's Hall of Fame.

Cast
Burt Lancaster as Jim Thorpe 
Billy Gray as Jim Thorpe as a child
Charles Bickford as Glenn S. "Pop" Warner 
Steve Cochran as Peter Allendine 
Phyllis Thaxter as Margaret Miller 
Dick Wesson as Ed Guyac 
Jack Bighead as Little Boy Who Walk Like Bear
Sonny Chorre as Wally Denny 
Al Mejia as Louis Tewanema 
Hubie Kerns as Tom Ashenbrunner
Jack Baston as King Gustav (uncredited) 
Jim Thorpe as Coaching Assistant (uncredited)

Accolades
The film is recognized by American Film Institute in these lists:
 2006: AFI's 100 Years...100 Cheers – Nominated

Epilogue
Jim Thorpe was stripped of his Olympic medals, as depicted in the movie.  After his death in 1953, the International Olympic Committee partly reinstated these honors in 1983 and fully reinstated them in 2022.

Footnotes

External links

1951 films
1950s biographical drama films
1950s sports films
American biographical drama films
American black-and-white films
American football films
Athletics films
Biographical films about sportspeople
Cultural depictions of American men
Cultural depictions of players of American football
Cultural depictions of track and field athletes
1950s English-language films
Films about the Summer Olympics
Films about Olympic track and field
Films directed by Michael Curtiz
Films scored by Max Steiner
Sports films based on actual events
Warner Bros. films
1951 drama films
1950s American films